Insulivitrina is genus of small air-breathing land snails, terrestrial pulmonate gastropod mollusks in the family Vitrinidae, the glass snails.

Species
Species with the genus Insulivitrina include:
 Insulivitrina machadoi
 Insulivitrina mascaensis
 Insulivitrina reticulata
 Insulivitrina tuberculata

References

 
Vitrinidae
Taxonomy articles created by Polbot